Hussain Shareef is a Kuwaiti judoka. He competed in the men's middleweight event at the 1984 Summer Olympics.

References

External links
 

Year of birth missing (living people)
Living people
Kuwaiti male judoka
Olympic judoka of Kuwait
Judoka at the 1984 Summer Olympics
Place of birth missing (living people)